= Madlur =

Madlur ShreeRangapur
- Village
- Madlur
- Nickname: Shiddabhoomi Or ShreeRangapur
- Country: India
- State: Karnataka
- District: Belgaum
- Established: Erab of Chalukya's

Languages
  - Official: Kannada
- Time zone: UTC+5:30 (IST)
- Postal code: 591117

Madlur is a village in the Belgaum district of Karnataka State, India. The village is famous for its history and its also called Siddhabhoomi. The place was once ruled by the Chalukyas. The ancient village is rich with the architecture of the Chalukyas. The Historical name of the place is Shreerangapur. Shree Shiddeshwar temple and Koranar Bhavi are the major attractions. Other major attractions are Marakumb Kola and lake Maagani.

== Demographics ==
Madlur is a large village located in Parasgad Taluka of Belgaum district, Karnataka with total 381 families residing. The Madlur village has population of 2090 of which 1071 are males while 1019 are females as per Population Census 2011.

In Madlur village population of children with age 0-6 is 315 which makes up 15.07 % of total population of village. Average Sex Ratio of Madlur village is 951 which is lower than Karnataka state average of 973. Child Sex Ratio for the Madlur as per census is 994, higher than Karnataka average of 948.Madlur village has lower literacy rate compared to Karnataka. In 2011, literacy rate of Madlur village was 59.61 % compared to 75.36 % of Karnataka. In Madlur Male literacy stands at 70.54 % while female literacy rate was 48.03 %.

The village has a Ratta sainika thana (military post), as well as features related to the Chalukyas. Before it became a village, the area was a commercial centre and a battlefield.

== Madlur Data ==
Particulars	Total	Male	Female
Total No. of Houses	381	-	-
Population	2,090	1,071	1,019
Child (0-6)	315	158	157
Schedule Caste	46	22	24
Schedule Tribe	3	2	1
Literacy	59.61 %	70.54 %	48.03 %
Total Workers	1,262	647	615
Main Worker	1,034	-	-
Marginal Worker	228	80	148

As per constitution of India and Panchyati Raaj Act, Madlur village is administrated by Sarpanch (Head of Village) who is elected representative of village.

== Caste Factor ==
Schedule Caste (SC) constitutes 2.20 % while Schedule Tribe (ST) were 0.14 % of total population in Madlur village.

== Work Profile ==
In Madlur village out of total population, 1262 were engaged in work activities. 81.93 % of workers describe their work as Main Work (Employment or Earning more than 6 Months) while 18.07 % were involved in Marginal activity providing livelihood for less than 6 months. Of 1262 workers engaged in Main Work, 300 were cultivators (owner or co-owner) while 620 were Agricultural labourer.
